Events from the year 1525 in France

Incumbents
 Monarch – Francis I

Events

24 February – Battle of Pavia
30 August – Treaty of the More

Births

Full date missing
René Boyvin, engraver (died 1598)
Guillaume Le Bé, punch cutter and engraver (died 1598)

Deaths
 
24 February – Louis II de la Trémoille, general (born 1460)
24 February – Galéas de Saint-Séverin, condottiere (born 1460s)

Full date missing
Guillaume Crétin, poet (born c.1460)
René of Savoy, nobleman and soldier (born 1473)
Antoine de Longueval, singer and composer (fl. 1498)
François de Lorraine, military officer (born 1506)

See also

References

1520s in France